Gymnastics events have been staged at the Olympic Games since 1896. Uzbekistani female artistic gymnasts have participated in every Olympic Games since 1996, except for 2012 when Luiza Galiulina competed in the event, but was eventually disqualified for doping. Uzbekistani women have yet to win a medal at the Olympics.

Gymnasts 

Notes
1 In 2008 and 2012, Chusovitina represented Germany.

2 In 2012, Galiulina was expelled from the Olympic Games for doping.

See also 
 Uzbekistan women's national gymnastics team

References

Uzbekistan
gymnasts
Olympic